Dr. Martha Christensen (born 4 January 1932, Ames, died 19 March 2017, Madison) was an American mycologist, botanist and educator known as an expert in fungal taxonomy and ecology, particularly for soil-dwelling fungi in the genera Aspergillus and Penicillium.

Education and career 
Christensen received her B.S. degree in 1953 from the University of Nebraska, and M.S. and Ph.D. degrees in botany from the University of Wisconsin–Madison.  She was hired as the first female faculty member in the Department of Botany at the University of Wyoming in 1963.

Service and awards 
She served as president of the Mycological Society of America from 1987–1988, and received the organization's William A. Weston Award in teaching excellence in 1991.  In 2013 she received the Johanna Westerdijk Award from the Westerdijk Fungal Biodiversity Institute.  As a conservationist she served as a board member and volunteer for the Wyoming Outdoor Council

Research 
Christensen's research covered a wide variety of mycological topics, and she was supported in that work by over 60 grants.  Over the course of her career she gathered free-dried a large fungal spore collection that was eventually donated to the Westerdijk Fungal Biodiversity Institute.  The species Penicillium christenseniae, Penicillium marthae-christenseniae, and Aspergillus christenseniae were named in her honor.

Further reading

References 

1932 births
2017 deaths
American women botanists
20th-century American botanists
Scientists from Iowa
People from Ames, Iowa
University of Nebraska alumni
University of Wyoming faculty
University of Wisconsin–Madison alumni
American mycologists
American conservationists
American ecologists
Women ecologists
American women academics
21st-century American women
20th-century American women scientists